Picote may refer to:

 Picote (Miranda do Douro), Portugal, a civil parish
 Picote Dam, Miranda do Douro
 Nebbiolo, an Italian wine grape variety also known as Picote

See also
 François-Marie Picoté de Belestre (1716–1793), colonial soldier for both New France and Great Britain
 Picotee